The Omega Men are a fictional team of extraterrestrial superheroes who have appeared in various comic book series published by DC Comics. They first appeared in Green Lantern (vol. 2) #141 (June 1981), and were created by Marv Wolfman and Joe Staton.

Publication history
After appearances in Green Lantern, Action Comics and The New Teen Titans, the Omega Men were featured in their own comics series which ran for 38 issues from April 1983 to May 1986. During its run, writer Roger Slifer and artist Keith Giffen created the mercenary anti-hero Lobo. Later creators included writers Doug Moench and Todd Klein (who also lettered later issues in the run), artists Tod Smith, Shawn McManus and Alex Niño, and inkers Mike DeCarlo, Jim McDermott and Greg Theakston.

Members of the Omega Men also appeared in the 2004 eight-issue Adam Strange limited series, as well as the 2005 Infinite Crisis lead-in 6-issue limited series, Rann-Thanagar War and the 2008 follow-up Rann-Thanagar Holy War.

In 2006 they had their own six issue limited series with Tigorr, Doc, Elu, Broot and Ryand'r - written by Andersen Gabrych and art by Henry Flint.

Fictional team history
The Omega Men hail from the Vega system, a planetary system with twenty-five habitable planets, which as of the early 1980s had been ruled for millennia by the Citadelians, a race of warriors cloned from the First Citadelian, the demi-godlike son of X'Hal.

The Citadelians established a tyrannical regime based in a fortress moon known as the Citadel. The citadel then set about to conquer the younger races of Vega. Originally there were only two races in the Vegan system, the primitive Branx and the pacifistic Okaarans, but the Psions used Okaaran DNA to create the other twenty-three races of Vega such as the Tamaraneans, Euphorixians, Aelloans, Karnans, and the Changralyns.

The Omega Men were assembled as a group of renegades and representatives of conquered Vegan worlds to fight Citadelian aggression. Pre-Infinite Crisis the team was based on the planet Kuraq. The Omega Men are important peacekeepers in their sector because the Green Lantern Corps is not allowed into Vegan space, due to a long-standing agreement with the Psions.

The Omega Men made a return appearance in the Adam Strange mini-series. Still led by Tigorr, with veteran members Broot, Doc, Elu, Artin and Harpis. They were joined by a group of new members whose names were given, but not identified in the book. They were still fighting the Spider Empire. A vision by one of their new members, a precog, results in them waiting in a Rannian space station for some time; their ultimate purpose to meet Adam Strange. It was in this storyline that the first Doc is discovered to be a Durlan assassin. Doc himself is presumed slain.

In the recent Omega Men mini-series, it had been revealed that upon returning to the remains of Tamaran with Ryand'r (who was not part of the team in the Adam Strange mini-series), the Omegans are attacked by the Darkstar zombies of Lady Styx and all but five of them died.

The Omega Men have been seen fleeing L.E.G.I.O.N. robots during a hostile takeover ousting Vril Dox.

Alternate versions
An alternate future has the Earth taken over by a new Nazi movement. A division of Omega Men participates in a rescue mission and all are killed.

Current members
Tigorr
Broot
Doc (apparently from the same species as the first Doc, with green coloring instead of purple)
Elu
Ryand'r (Darkfire)
Felicity (Nebula): the very same Felicity that died during Invasion!, she refused to be converted into one of Lady Styx's Darkstars and stayed in a limbo, from which she later came out changed in a new super-powered form.

Founding members
Primus: Primus is a telepath and telekinetic from planet Euphorix. Dies during Invasion! storyline, shot down by guards.
Kalista: widow of Primus, sorceress from planet Euphorix.
Tigorr: Taghurrhu of planet Karna, last of his kind.
Broot: super strong and durable, born of a pacifist society on Changralyn. Rejected from his society for resorting to violence.
Nimbus: disembodied agent of reincarnation of Branx warriors, later planetary guardian of Kuraq.
Harpis: sister of Demonia from planet Aello, mutated by Psions, killed by Lady Styx' Darkstars.
Demonia: sister of Harpis from planet Aello, mutated by Psions, betrayed the team, killed by Tigorr.
Felicity: last female of Tigorr's species, died during Invasion! storyline when shape-shifting Durlans attacked.
Doc: bio-organic doctor from Aello, killed by Durlan assassin in Adam Strange mini-series.
Shlagen: team mechanic, from planet Slagg, died in battle against Lady Styx.

Later members
Elu: a shy energy being and Ryand'r's best friend
Ryand'r: brother of Starfire, from Old Tamaran, now goes by the name Darkfire. In the Teen Titans Go! comics, he is renamed Wildfire.
Auron: Lambien of Okaara, son of the goddess X'Hal, godlike energy powers.
Green Man: ex-Green Lantern from planet Uxor, died during Invasion! storyline.
Artin: artificial intelligence created by the Psions who holds a recording of Primus' brain in his memory, destroyed by Lady Styx's Darkstars.
Rynoc: male warrior from Okaara, deceased.
Zirral: female from Old Tamaran.
Ynda: Kallista's cousin from Euphorix and love interest of Ryand'r, died during Invasion!.
Oho-Besh: a Changralyn priest, deceased.
Uhlan: a Gordanian from Karna.
Seer
Cecilia 
Dark Flea
Chantale
Vandal
Lianna: female member of the Guardians of the Universe.

Deceased members
Primus
Kalista
Felicity (resurrected)
Shlagen
Rynoc
Ynda
Green Man
Doc 
Seer
Cecilia
Chantale
Dark Flea
Demonia
Harpis
Vandal

Other members
Typical
Outrage
Doc Rod
Infinite
Soap
Exkurt
Dark Ord
Zen
High Voltage
Galanta
Arguth
Tilian
Magnum 
Preside
Folex
Light Sheperd
Deka

The New 52
In The New 52, a modified version of the Omega Men dubbed The Omegas was introduced. The new group consists of young aliens under the tutelage of Zealot. Each of the aliens' parents were enslaved by Lobo, and they are united in seeking revenge on the marauder.

The Omegas members
Primus
Kalista
Tigorr

DC You
In 2015, as part of the "DC You" revamp of the DC Comics, a new Omega Men series was launched. The new series, which lasted 12 issues, retroactively replaced the previous "New 52" Omega group in canon.

The series, written by Tom King, rebooted the entire story of the Omega Men. In the new canon, the Citadel is now an interplanetary corporation. The Citadel, exploiting the chaos from the destruction of Krypton, has begun selling thousands of worlds rare metal that can be used to "stabilize planetary cores" to prevent a world from exploding ala Krypton. The rare, planetary core stabilizing metal, is only available in the Vega Star system. The planets of the Vega Star system as a result, have been wholesale enslaved by the alien corporation. Several worlds, whose inhabitants resisted the Citadal, were subjected to genocide: survivors of the genocide from these worlds, became the Omega Men. The group is led by Primus, recast as a wealthy pacifist who was imprisoned by the Citadel to silence him.

Due to the power and influence over thousands of worlds, the Citadel has framed the Omega Men as terrorists and murderers. The reach of the Citadel even ascends to Earth: after making contact with the US Military, to broker a deal to sell them metal from the Vega Star System, the US Government secretly sends Kyle Rayner to broker a deal with the Citadel at the start of the twelve issue series. However, the head of the Citadel corporation forces Kyle to surrender his white power ring upon meeting him (for "security" reasons; in truth, due to him coveting the ring for his own selfish desires). Shortly afterwards, Kyle is kidnapped by the Omega Men, who fake his death and then force Kyle to join them on a tour of the Vega Star System so he could see the evil of the Citadel and expose their sins.

Kyle eventually realizes the truth about the Citadel and with the Omega Men's help, crash an interview with the head of the Citadel, in order to air recorded footage of the Citadel destroying an entire populated planet that had been mined dry of the rare metal. The move clears the Omega Men's good name but fails to stop the Citadel's activities in the Vega Star System. A final battle between the Citadel and the Omega Men then ensues, ending in the death of the Citadel's leadership caste. Meanwhile, Kyle, who had assumed the alias of "Green Man" during the time with the Omega Men, regains his White Lantern ring and is ultimately banished back to Earth by the Omega Men when he fails to convince them to spare the leaders of the Citadel.

The Omega Men members
Primus
Tigorr
Broot
DOC
Scrapps
Kyle Rayner
Kalista

References

Sources

External links
 Titans Tower: The Vegan Star System
 An index of the Omega Men series
 Welcome to Vega: Omega Men at Cosmic Teams!
 DCU Guide: Omega Men
 Preview pages for issue #1 of the current mini-series and issue #2